A Murder of Quality is a 1991 television film directed by Gavin Millar and a screenplay written by John le Carré, based on his 1962 novel A Murder of Quality , first screened on 10 April 1991 on ITV in the United Kingdom and shown in the United States of America on 13 October 1991 on the A&E network.

Plot
George Smiley, at the request of his old wartime colleague Ailsa Brimley, investigates the murder of Stella Rode. A letter had previously come to Brimley from Rode detailing a plot supposedly by her husband, Stanley Rode, who teaches at Carne School, to kill her. Upon investigating, Smiley learns of many secrets that were kept by the victim, and one being that Terence Fielding, a house master at Carne, was being blackmailed by her due to past homosexual activities. Smiley solves the investigation when it is revealed that it was not Stanley Rode who murdered his wife, but Terence Fielding.

Cast
Denholm Elliott as George Smiley
Joss Ackland as Terence Fielding 
Glenda Jackson as Ailsa Brimley
Billie Whitelaw as Mad Janie
Diane Fletcher as Shane Hecht
David Threlfall as Stanley Rode
Christian Bale as Tim Perkins
 Nick Lewis as Tim Perkins's Friend

Critical reception
The New York Times wrote "Chronic Anglophiles can be assured that Mr. le Carre's fury is generally conveyed with ingrained British understatement and good manners. A top-notch cast makes sure of that. Mr. Elliott is perfect as the gray, piercingly intelligent Smiley; and his co-stars are sparkling."

References

External links

A Murder of Quality at the British Film Institute (BFI)

1991 television films
1991 films
British television films
Crime television films
Cold War spy films
Films based on works by John le Carré
ITV television dramas
Spy television films
Television shows produced by Thames Television
English-language television shows
Films directed by Gavin Millar
Films scored by Stanley Myers
1990s English-language films